Aingtha is a village in the Mandalay Region of north-west Myanmar. It lies in Kyaukpadaung Township in the Myingyan District. The villages lies east off the bank of the Ayeyarwady River.

See also
List of cities, towns and villages in Burma: A

References

Populated places in Mandalay Region